Jack or Jackie Carr may refer to:

Sports
Jack Carr (billiards player) (fl. 1815–1825), English billiards player
Jack Carr (footballer, born 1878) (1878–1948), English footballer for Newcastle United and England
Jackie Carr (footballer, born 1892) (1892–1942), English footballer for Middlesbrough, Blackpool, Hartlepool United, and England
Jack Carr (Australian footballer) (1913–1997), Australian footballer for Melbourne
Jackie Carr (footballer, born 1924) (1924–1990), Scottish footballer for Gillingham
Jackie Carr (footballer, born 1926) (1926–1996), South African-born footballer for Huddersfield Town
Jack Carr (racing driver), former NASCAR Grand National driver in the 1950 Southern 500

Others
Jack Carr (animator) (1906–1967), American animator and voice actor
Jack Carr (politician) (born 1975), politician in the province of New Brunswick, Canada
Jack Carr (writer), American author

See also
John Carr (disambiguation)